Hermann Friedrich Gmeiner (1870–1918) was a physician and first Professor for veterinary internal medicine at the Veterinary Faculty at the University of Giessen (1901–1918). He was succeeded by Friedrich Wilhelm Zwick (1871–1941).

Publications
"Demodex folliculorum des Menschen und der Tiere" - Friedrich Gmeiner (W. Braumüller, 1908)
"Demodex folliculorum des Menschen und der Tiere" - Friedrich Gmeiner - Full text

Bibliography
"Hermann Friedrich Gmeiner (1870–1918) : erster Fachvertreter für innere Veterinärmedizin an der Universität Giessen (1901–1918)" - Gerhard Gilla (JustusLiebig- Universität, 1990)

References

German veterinarians
1870 births
1918 deaths